Zoltán Szita (born 10 February 1998) is a Hungarian handball player for SC Pick Szeged, and the Hungarian national team.

He represented Hungary at the 2019 World Men's Handball Championship.

Individual awards
 Hungarian Youth Handballer of the Year: 2016, 2017
 Hungarian Junior Handballer of the Year: 2019

References

External links

1998 births
Living people
People from Veszprém
Hungarian male handball players
Expatriate handball players in Poland
Hungarian expatriate sportspeople in Poland
Veszprém KC players
Wisła Płock (handball) players
Sportspeople from Veszprém County